Pulsarella cognata is a species of sea snail, a marine gastropod mollusk in the family Borsoniidae.

Description
The length of the shell attains 24 mm, its width 7 mm. It differs from Tomopleura reevii (C. B. Adams, 1850) to which it is closely related in color (being luteous white, purple-tinged towards the apex, the carinae white), in the number of carinae, twelve, and more produced spire.

Distribution
This marine species is endemic to Australia (New South Wales, Queensland).

References

 Smith, E.A. (1877a) Diagnoses of new species of Pleurotomidae in the British Museum. Annals and Magazine of Natural History, series 4, 19, 488–501
 Hedley, C. 1908. Studies on Australian Mollusca. Part 10. Proceedings of the Linnean Society of New South Wales 33: 456-489
  Hedley, C. 1922. A revision of the Australian Turridae. Records of the Australian Museum 13(6): 213-359, pls 42-56
 Laseron, C. 1954. Revision of the New South Wales Turridae (Mollusca). Australian Zoological Handbook. Sydney : Royal Zoological Society of New South Wales 1-56, pls 1-12.

External links
 

cognata
Gastropods of Australia
Gastropods described in 1877